The 1992 UEFA Cup Final was played on 29 April 1992 and 13 May 1992 between Ajax of the Netherlands and Torino of Italy. Ajax won on away goals after a 2–2 draw in the first leg in Turin and a 0–0 draw in the second in Amsterdam. The victory made Ajax only the second club – after Torino's city rivals Juventus – to have won all three major European trophies (European Cup/UEFA Champions League, UEFA Cup/UEFA Europa League, and UEFA Cup Winners' Cup).

Route to the final

As punishment for hooliganism from Ajax supporters, UEFA ordered a temporary relocation of Ajax's home matches, requiring them to be played at least 200 kilometers away from Amsterdam. As a result, for the first three rounds of the competition, Ajax played their 'home' legs at the Rheinstadion in Düsseldorf, Germany. Despite this disadvantage, the Dutch side were still able to qualify for the final without ever truly facing serious threat of elimination.

Match details

First leg

Second leg

See also
1991–92 UEFA Cup
AFC Ajax in European football
Torino F.C. in European football

Notes

References

RSSSF

2
Uefa Cup Final 1992
Uefa Cup Final 1992
1992
Uefa Cup Final 1992
Uefa Cup Final 1992
Uefa Cup Final
Uefa Cup Final
Final
UEFA Cup Final
UEFA Cup Final
1990s in Turin
1990s in Amsterdam
UEFA Cup Final, 1992
Sports competitions in Turin